4/4 and 4/4 Part 2 are the respective first and second extended plays by American hip hop rapper Meek Mill. They were released by Dream Chasers Records and Maybach Music Group digitally for free download and stream on My Mixtapez January 16 and January 30, 2016, respectively. Both 4/4 and its second counterpart feature production by C-Sick, Jahlil Beats, The Beat Bully, Ben Billions, ChopSquad DJ, Mando Fresh, Southside, DannyBoyStyles and J.Oliver with the latter featuring guest appearances from Dave East, Future, Omelly and Tdot Illdude. The second installment of the 4/4 extended play project, was released fifteen minutes shortly after Mill's rival, Drake, released a diss track aimed towards him, "Summer Sixteen"; the EP, itself, includes a response track called "War Pain". Mill later revealed that Drake's alleged ghostwriter, Quentin Miller, sent him the lyrics to "Summer Sixteen" before it was released, which influenced Meek's response in "War Pain".

The 4/4 extended play project was also used as a template to help promote Meek Mill's mixtape, DC4, the fourth installment to the Dreamchasers mixtape series, which was later released on October 28, 2016.

Track listing 

Sample credits
 "Pray For 'Em" contains a sample of the song Planet Hell by Nightwish.
 "I'm The Plug (Freestyle)" contains a sample of the songs Jumpman and I'm the Plug by Drake and Future.
 "Slippin'" contains a sample of the song Slippin' by DMX.

References 

2016 EPs
Meek Mill EPs
Maybach Music Group albums
EP series
Albums produced by C-Sick
Albums produced by Jahlil Beats
Albums produced by Southside (record producer)